Jean Nellie Liang (born 1958) is an economist who currently serves as President Joe Biden's Under Secretary of the Treasury for Domestic Finance.

Education 

Liang graduated from the University of Notre Dame with a B.A. in economics in 1979. She later completed an M.A. (1984) and Ph.D. (1986) in economics at the University of Maryland, College Park. Liang's doctoral thesis was An empirical conjectural variation model of oligopoly.

Career 

Prior to her government service, Liang was a private sector economist in Washington, D. C., starting at Wharton Econometric Forecasting Associates from 1979 to 1980, then at Data Resources Inc. from 1980 to 1981. From 1981 to 1984, Liang taught economics at the University of Maryland, College Park. In the summer of 1983, Liang was an economist for MCI Inc. Liang was a research associate at the Bureau of Economics at the Federal Trade Commission from 1985 to 1986.

After completing her doctorate, Liang joined the Federal Reserve Board as an economist at the financial structure division in 1986. After eight years at financial structure, Liang moved to the capital markets section in 1994. Liang headed the capital markets section from 1997 to 2001. In 2001, Liang became assistant director for research and statistics for the Federal Reserve Board. The Fed promoted Liang to senior associate director in 2006. In 2010, Liang became the founding director of the Division of Financial Stability.

Liang left the Fed after nearly 30 years to become Miriam K. Carliner Senior Fellow in Economic Studies at the Brookings Institution in February 2017. At Brookings, her research focused on financial and macroeconomic stability, credit markets, and financial regulatory and macroprudential policies.

Federal Reserve Board nomination 

Liang was nominated by President Trump for membership on the Federal Reserve Board on September 19, 2018. She withdrew herself as a nominee on January 7, 2019, after months passed without the United States Senate granting her a hearing. Liang cited the possibility of being left in "professional limbo" as her reason for her withdrawal.

U.S. Department of the Treasury 
Liang was announced as a nominee by President Biden to serve as Under Secretary for Domestic Finance at the U.S. Department of the Treasury on March 11, 2021.  The Senate confirmed Liang on July 15, 2021, in a 72–27 vote. She was sworn into office on July 22, 2021, and is the first Senate-confirmed Under Secretary for Domestic Finance in office since September 2014. On February 15, 2022, the secretary presented findings of the President's Working Group on Financial Markets and other agencies on potential congressional regulation of the stablecoin markets.

At Treasury, Liang has been instrumental in leading the Department's efforts to address stablecoins, arguing that stablecoins need to be brought into the U.S. public policy framework. Additionally, Liang played a leading role in producing a number of reports for the Treasury Department in response to President Biden's Executive Order on Ensuring Responsible Development in Digital Assets.

Liang has also lead the Treasury Department's work on policy surrounding Banks and nonbanks. Liang is supportive of macroprudential financial regulation approaches taken to date, but has argued that policymakers and regulators must continue to look ahead for emerging threats.

References

1958 births
Living people
21st-century American economists
American people of Chinese descent
University of Maryland, College Park alumni
University of Notre Dame alumni
United States Department of the Treasury officials
Biden administration personnel